Target for Killing is a 1966 Austrian-German-Italian crime film directed by Manfred R. Köhler and starring Stewart Granger. It was shot between Maghreb, Yugoslavia and Rome.

Cast
 Stewart Granger as James Vine
 Karin Dor as Sandra Perkins
 Rupert Davies as Kommissar Saadi
 Curd Jürgens as Gérard van Looch / Giant
 Adolfo Celi as Henry Perkins
 Scilla Gabel as Tigra
 Klaus Kinski as Caporetti
 Molly Peters as Vera
 Erika Remberg as Stewardess
 Luis Induni as Dr. Yang
 José Marco Rosello as Cloyd
 Demeter Bitenc as Killer
 Allen Pinson as Co-Pilot
 Slobodan Dimitrijević as Killer
 Wilbert Gurley as Zonga

References

External links

1966 films
1966 crime films
1960s spy thriller films
German crime films
German spy thriller films
Austrian crime films
Italian crime films
Italian spy thriller films
West German films
1960s German-language films
Films shot in Montenegro
Films shot in Yugoslavia
Films set in Lebanon
1960s German films
1960s Italian films